Players and pairs who neither have high enough rankings nor receive wild cards may participate in a qualifying tournament held one week before the annual Wimbledon Tennis Championships.

Seeds

  Stephen Huss /  Johan Landsberg (qualified)
  Todd Perry /  Thomas Shimada (qualified)
  Amir Hadad /  Aisam-ul-Haq Qureshi (qualifying competition, lucky losers)
 n/a
  Marco Chiudinelli /  Lovro Zovko (qualified)
  Alun Jones /  Anthony Ross (first round)
  Yuri Schukin /  Dmitry Vlasov (first round)
  Rik de Voest /  Wesley Moodie (first round)

Qualifiers

  Stephen Huss /  Johan Landsberg
  Todd Perry /  Thomas Shimada
  Marco Chiudinelli /  Lovro Zovko
  Jonathan Erlich /  Andy Ram

Lucky losers

  Amir Hadad /  Aisam-ul-Haq Qureshi
  Scott Draper /  Peter Luczak

Qualifying draw

First qualifier

Second qualifier

Third qualifier

Fourth qualifier

External links

2003 Wimbledon Championships – Men's draws and results at the International Tennis Federation

Men's Doubles Qualifying
Wimbledon Championship by year – Men's doubles qualifying